Gilles Freyer is a French professor, oncologist and medical professional who has specialised in the field of gynaecological cancers. He is currently head of the Department of Medical Oncology and Vice-Dean of the University of Lyon. He is also the current Medical Director of the Cancer Institute of the Hospices Civils de Lyon. He is known for having been the President of the cooperative group GINECO (Groupe d'Investigateurs National des Etudes des Cancers Ovariens et du sein) from 2013. He was also a member of the International Scientific Committee of INCa (French National Cancer Institute).  Professor Freyer is also known for being the President of the Monaco Age Oncologie and the Co-President of the Biennale Monégasque de Cancérologie.

Education 
Freyer obtained his MD in 1994 and specialised in medical oncology the following year. He then obtained a degree in clinical pharmacology and psychophysiology at the University of Lyon I in 1995-96. In 1996, he obtained a master's degree in human biology from the same University. He also specialised in bioethics at the University of Paris in 1997. He obtained his PhD in Population Pharmacokinetics in 2000 at the University of Lyon.

Significant Academic Publications 

 
 </ref>

Controversy 

In 2019, Pr Freyer as the main teacher of Ethics at Lyon Sud faculty of medicine was accused of being homophobic and sexist during his classes by the media Mediacités. An administrative inquiry concluded that the remarks made “do not call for referral to justice or disciplinary proceedings” .

Nevertheless, the mission points to Professor Freyer's "obvious taste" for provocation, which translates into "sometimes untimely little phrases or humorous strokes". "If he gives the impression of being often provocative, not on the merits but on the fringes of his teaching, he does not, however, exceed, according to the mission, the implicit limits which impose his status on him".

The mission nevertheless recommends that the teacher take “more account of the very strong sensitivities that are expressed today on societal issues”.

His controversial comments are still a subject of conversations inside the walls of the faculty as Pr Gilles Freyer may be a potential successor to the dean.

Books authored 

 Ovarian Cancer in Elderly Patients. Germany: Springer International Publishing, 2015.  
 Freyer, Gilles. Faire face au cancer: L’espoir au quotidien. France: Editions Odile Jacob, 2008.  
 Freyer, Gilles. Dénoncer et bannir: ou L'Obscurantisme progressiste. France: Jacques André éditeur, 2019.
 Freyer, Gilles. Sciences humaines et sociales en médecine et pharmacie. France: Ellipses, 2009.

References

External links 

 Gilles Freyer at Google Scholar
 Gilles Freyer at ResearchGate
 Gilles Freyer at mediacites
 

Living people
Cancer researchers
French oncologists
French gynaecologists
Year of birth missing (living people)